Dulong is a rural locality in the Sunshine Coast Region, Queensland, Australia.

History 
The name Dulong is believed to be an Aboriginal word meaning mud or wet clay.

Dulong Provisional School opened on 8 July 1895, becoming Dulong State School on 1 January 1909. It closed due to local attendances in 1929 but reopened in 1930. It closed permanently in 1967. The school was located at the north-west corner of the intersection of Dulong School Road and Sherwell Road.

Notable residents 
 Estelle Thompson – crime novelist

References 

Suburbs of the Sunshine Coast Region
Localities in Queensland